King's Highway 115, commonly referred to as Highway 115, is a provincially maintained highway in the Canadian province of Ontario that connects Peterborough with Toronto via Highway 401. The highway begins at a junction with Highway 401 southwest of Newcastle and ends at an at-grade intersection with Highway 7 east of Peterborough. 

Highway 115 is part of the Algonquin Trail and concurrent with Highway 35 from its southern terminus in Clarington to Enterprise Hill, where it veers towards Peterborough and Highway 35 continues north into the Kawarthas. It is also part of the Trans-Canada Highway from the interchange with Highway 7 south of Springville, Ontario to the northern terminus of the highway. Highway 115 is a freeway northeast of Enterprise Hill and a Right-in/right-out (RIRO) expressway south of it, featuring short ramps with abrupt right turns to and from the highway. By January 2010, exit numbers were added to the freeway section north of the Highway 35 concurrency.

Route description 

For the length of this concurrency, it is a divided four lane RIRO expressway. Here, Highway 35/115 meets the eastern terminus of Highway 407 at a modified trumpet interchange in Clarington, and at Enterprise Hill, the expressway curves eastward and Highway 35 exits, continuing north towards Lindsay. Highway 115 continues northeast, and the two carriageways diverge, making it a freeway.

Most of the remainder of the highway is straight and surrounded by agricultural lands and forests, until it meets Highway 7. From this point northeastward, Highway 115 is part of the southern Ontario route of the Trans-Canada Highway and concurrent with Highway 7. The freeway continues along the southern edge of Peterborough and ends at Lansdowne Street to the east of the city. Highway 7 continues east towards Ottawa.

History 

Highway 115 was a new highway constructed in the mid-1950s and gradually improved over the following 40 years. Initially, the route was constructed as a two lane connection from Highway 35 near Pontypool to Highway 28 on the outskirts of Peterborough. Because of this, it was known as the Pontypool–Peterborough Road. It was eventually extended to Highway 7 on the east side of Peterborough and later widened to a four-lane expressway in the late 1980s. Since then, improvements have been proposed to extend Highway 115 east to Highway 28, but none have come to fruition.

In 1953, construction began on a two lane road northeastward from Highway 35 south of Pontypool, with the purpose of creating a shorter route between Toronto and Peterborough. The Pontypool–Peterborough Road, as it was referred to during construction, was completed and designated as Highway 115 on March 17, 1955, ending at an intersection with Highway 28 which became notoriously dangerous.

In 1961, Highway 115 was extended southward to the 401, becoming concurrent with Highway 35. That same year, the new Peterborough By-pass opened, providing a route for Highway 7 around the south side of the city via Monaghan Parkway. Highway 115 was later extended east to connect with the bypass, and the northern terminus became the intersection of Erskine Avenue and Lansdowne Street (the former Highway 7A). The  extension was opened at a ribbon-cutting ceremony on August 25, 1978.

The entire length of the highway south of Highway 7 was widened to four lanes in the 1980s and early 1990s. Later, Highway 115 was rerouted to join Highway 7 on the newly four-laned Peterborough By-pass route. Although Highway 115 currently meets many Ontario freeway design standards northeast of the Highway 35 interchange, there are currently no plans to re-designate this section as a 400-series highway (like Highway 415 or a non-tolled section of Highway 407).

Exit list

References
Sources

Bibliography

External links 

115
Kawartha Lakes
Transport in Clarington